Pechina is a municipality of Province of Almería, in the autonomous community of Andalusia, Spain.  It is on the site of the ancient town of Urci.

Pechina, called Bajjāna in Arabic, was the centre of a Yemeni colony during the period of the Umayyad caliphate in Spain. Founded before 886, the self-governing colony was known as the ursh al-Yaman. In 922 it was incorporated into the caliphate. It oversaw a ribat (fortress) and maintained its own navy that could be put use for piracy or official Umayyad campaigns. Between 939 and 944 it took part in four expeditions against the Franks, Idrisids and Fatimids. By 955, it had been eclipsed by Almería.

Demographics

Notable people 

 Leonardo Nitu
 Khashkhash Ibn Saeed

References

External links

  Pechina—Sistema de Información Multiterritorial de Andalucía
  Pechina—Diputación Provincial de Almería

Municipalities in the Province of Almería
City-states